Jean Riachi (born 1963) is the founder and current CEO and Chairman of the Board of I&C Bank, Lebanon's largest specialized Bank

Jean Riachi is also the Chairman of FFA Private Bank Dubai Limited, a financial services firm regulated by the DFSA and operating from the Dubai International Financial Center (DIFC).

Education
Born and raised in Lebanon, Jean Riachi completed his high school education at Lycee Louis-le-Grand in Paris and graduated from HEC Paris business school in 1985. He also holds a Certificate in Corporate Governance (IDP-C) from INSEAD's International Directors Program.

References

1963 births
Living people
HEC Paris alumni
INSEAD alumni
Lebanese businesspeople
Lebanese bankers
Lycée Louis-le-Grand alumni